2013 Final Four may refer to:
2013 NCAA Men's Division I Basketball Tournament
2013 NCAA Women's Division I Basketball Tournament
2013 Final Four Men's Volleyball Cup